Saturday Night Sever is the second album by Australian metalcore band Buried in Verona. The album was released on 8 June 2010 through Riot Entertainment and Warner Music Group.

Track listing

Personnel
Buried in Verona
Brett Anderson – Lead vocals
Mick Taylor – guitar
Katongo Chituta – guitar
Richie Newman – guitar, clean vocals
Scott Richmond – Bass guitar
Chris Mellross – Drums

Production
Fredrik Nordström - Producer, engineer

References

2010 albums
Buried in Verona albums